"Love You Anymore" is a song by Canadian recording artist Michael Bublé. It is taken from his eighth studio album, Love, and was released on October 10, 2018.

Background
"The moment I first heard 'Love You Anymore,' I knew right away that I had to record it and put it on my new record. I can't wait for my fans to hear it. In fact, I can't wait for them to hear the entire album because I'm really proud of what we’ve created this time out", Bublé said.

Due to his son Noah's recovery from cancer, Bublé was able to return to the studio to create the new record as a token of his gratitude to his fans.

Charts

Weekly charts

Year-end charts

References

2018 songs
2018 singles
Reprise Records singles
Michael Bublé songs
Songs written by Scott Harris (songwriter)
Songs written by Ilsey Juber
Songs written by Charlie Puth